Amanda Nestoria Forsberg (born 26 February 1846) was a Swedish ballerina.

Forsberg was born in Stockholm.  She was a student at the Royal Swedish Ballet in 1863 and a premier dancer in 1864–69; she was a premier dancer at the Staatsoper Unter den Linden in Berlin in 1870–1882.

Her dance was, according to contemporary critics, characterized by an "unusual airy" finesse and an "intoxicating virginal modesty", and she was also recommended for her mimicry.

References 

 Adolf Lindgren och Nils Personne, Svenskt porträttgalleri (1897), volym XXI. Tonkonstnärer och sceniska artister

1846 births
Swedish ballerinas
Year of death missing
19th-century Swedish ballet dancers
Royal Swedish Ballet dancers